Hamilton City Council is the territorial authority for the New Zealand city of Hamilton.

The council is led by the mayor of Hamilton, who is currently . There are also 14 ward councillors.

Council elections are held every three years.

Composition

The council has three wards or constituencies. One Maaori ward covers the whole city and has two councillors, elected by voters on the Māori electoral roll. Two general wards, East and West, have six councillors each, elected by voters on the general electoral roll. The East and West wards cover half the city, with the boundary between the two being the Waikato River. 

The current council members are:

History

The current city council was formed as part of the 1989 local government reorganisation, which added parts of Waikato and Waipā counties to the previous city area.

Several councils, boards and committees had preceded it –

 The first local government in the area was Kirikiriroa Road Board formed by a meeting in 1868. Kirikiriroa Road Board covered the east bank of the Waikato from Tamahere to Taupiri. Hamilton East took over its area from the Road Board in 1872 and the Board had its last meeting on 7 March 1921, before becoming part of Waikato County.
 Hamilton West Highway District was set up on 14 August 1871 and a similar district for Hamilton East shortly after.
 Hamilton parish vestry committee was formed in 1876. 
 Hamilton Borough Council was first elected on 7 February 1878.
 Frankton Borough Council was formed in 1913, but merged with Hamilton in 1917, after a poll in 1916. Its last meeting was on 30 March 1917.

Phillip Yeung was elected as a Councillor in the East Ward in the October 2019 election, but died while in office. A by-election was held in February 2018 to replace Phillip and Councillor Ryan Hamilton was elected.

In 2020, the electoral system was changed from First Past the Post to Single Transferable Vote, following consultation in which 78.1% supported STV.

Council offices 

Hamilton Borough Council first met in Collingwood Street courthouse. In April 1878 an immigrant cottage on Victoria Street was adapted as council chambers. After 1905 it was used as an insurance office, until demolished for the Security Building in 1924. That building was replaced by the Novotel, which opened in 1999.

On 23 March 1905 Richard Seddon opened a ₤3,510 town hall, with a council chamber, further south, near the Municipal Baths. It was enlarged in 1914 and demolished in 1967.

On 22 October 1932 ferro-concrete offices and a gas showroom were opened in Alma Street, bringing all the offices together, at a cost of ₤10,082, paid for by profits from electricity supply. On 2 July 1949 1XH Hamilton started broadcasting from the basement of the Alma Street offices. When the council moved in 1960, 1XH took over the whole building, then 1YW took over one of 1XH’s two studios and, in 1968, a television station also moved in. The building is protected by a District Plan heritage listing and is now occupied by several businesses.

In June 1960 the offices moved into a 4-storey building, with 2-storey wings (a library in the east wing), was opened in July 1960, between Anglesea, Caro and Worley Streets and a multi-storey block, built over Worley Street, added between 1980 and 1983.

References

External links
 Hamilton City Council
Photos

 1906 Town Hall
 Alma Street offices - 1935, 1970s as 1ZH
 Anglesey Street offices 1959, opening, Municipal chamber

Politics of Hamilton, New Zealand
City councils in New Zealand